Ethyl maltol is an organic compound that is a common flavourant in some confectioneries.  It is related to the more common flavorant maltol by replacement of the methyl group by an ethyl group. It is a white solid with a sweet smell that can be described as caramelized sugar or as caramelized fruit.

The conjugate base derived from ethylmaltol, again like maltol, has a high affinity for iron, forming a red coordination complex.  In such compounds, the heterocycle is a bidentate ligand.

References

Flavors
Flavor enhancers
Perfume ingredients
4-Pyrones
Enols
Sweet-smelling chemicals